The Engines of God is a science fiction novel by American  author Jack McDevitt.

Plot overview
A group of xeno-archaeologists, together with interstellar pilot Priscilla Hutchins, attempt to unravel the mysteries surrounding tremendous monuments left near several habitable worlds in the solar neighborhood.

Plot summary

Background
Humanity was introduced to the existence of intelligent extraterrestrial life with the discovery of an alien statue on Iapetus, a moon of Saturn, which depicted an alien life form. Then, after the advent of faster-than-light travel, when humanity began to explore neighboring star systems, a number of other mysterious Monuments were quickly discovered.

Despite these discoveries, details about the "Monument-Makers" themselves remained elusive. In fact, even after decades of exploring, humanity had found disappointingly few habitable worlds, and even fewer signs of intelligent alien life. At the time, only three examples had been identified:

(a) The planet Pinnacle, which had evidently been home to an intelligent society that became extinct nearly a million years earlier, and had left very little trace of themselves on their now-inhospitable planet;

(b) The planet Quraqua, which had many similarities to Earth, had been home to an intelligent species (the Quraquans) until they became extinct just a few centuries prior; and

(c) Inakademeri, a.k.a. "Nok", a moon of a ringed gas giant, and home to the only known living intelligent species, the Noks, although their technology was roughly equivalent to Earth's early 20th century, and at the time were locked in a long global conflict roughly analogous to World War I.

This lack of easily habitable worlds posed a significant problem because Earth itself was becoming increasingly inhospitable. By the year 2202, significant rise in sea-level due to centuries of pollution had altered the environment of the planet considerably, and famine was rampant in many parts of the world. Many hoped to somehow establish an off-world colony.

Plot
The story primarily follows Priscilla Hutchins – also known as "Hutch" – a prestigious starship pilot for the Academy (the organization responsible for many on- and off-world scientific endeavors). Hutch receives orders to take the Academy ship "Winckelmann" and evacuate the final archaeological team on the planet Quraqua.

This evacuation is the result of a complicated series of political maneuvers, and is not favored by the Academy, which until this point had conducted extensive surveys of the planet in an attempt to learn about the former alien inhabitants of the world.

The now-extinct Quraquans had a complex history spanning tens of thousands of years, and scientists had expected to have an unlimited timeframe for scientific discovery.

Instead, they were being driven out after only 28 years, so that Quraqua could be terraformed; as the most Earth-like planet discovered so far, there was a tremendous pressure to begin transforming it into a New Earth, due to the deteriorating conditions of Earth itself.

A total evacuation was called for, due to the nature of the terraforming process. Many nuclear devices were to be detonated in the planet's polar ice caps, in order to raise the world's sea level and bring about a warming climate change. This terraforming effort was being led by the wealthy corporation, Kosmik.

Just before Hutch was set to leave Earth, the science team on Quraqua – led by Henry Jacobi – made a significant discovery. They uncovered a series of carvings that depicted mostly the native Quraquans, but additionally, they discovered one that bore an uncanny resemblance to the statue on Iapetus – presumably, one of the Monument-Makers. Even more perplexing, the apparent Monument-Maker took the form of a god of death in the artwork.

Given this startling connection between the Quraquans and the Monument-Makers, the Academy desperately tried to postpone the terraforming process, but overwhelming political pressure prevented this from happening. Instead, one of the leading experts on the Monument-Makers, Richard Wald, joined Hutch on the voyage to Quraqua, so he could lend his expertise to the dig during the little time they had remaining.

After a journey through space lasting nearly a month, Hutch and Richard arrived at the Quraqua star system. Before landing on the planet, however, Richard wanted to explore a unique feature on the planet's moon: a giant "Monument" that had been named "Oz."

Oz superficially resembled a city, composed of giant cubic and rectangular structures. These structures, however, had no interior space and no exterior features.

Until this point, nobody in the scientific community had been able to offer any theories about Oz's existence or construction. Many scientists, including Richard, did not even believe it was a product of the Monument-Makers; all of the other known Monuments were elegant and many were floating in space, and this faux-city was crude and unwieldy by comparison.

But with the discovery of the depiction of a Monument-Maker on the planet below, Richard was intent on reevaluating Oz, in the hope of finding a definite link between the two cultures. In the end, they discovered several facts:

(a) The monument was built approximately in the year 9000 B.C.

(b) Many of the structures featured damage and mysterious scorch-marks, which also dated to roughly 9000 B.C.

(c) The "city's" layout was perfectly symmetrical and composed of regular cubic units, with the notable exception of two cylindrical towers.

(d) One of the towers held a short inscription that was in one of the ancient languages of the Quraquans. This was bewildering because the Quraquans never developed space travel; someone else must have inscribed it. Although they could identify the language, they could not read the inscription.

After investigating Oz, Hutch and Richard made their way to Quraqua's surface. Hutch made one more attempt to get the terraforming operation postponed by contacting the terraforming project's director, Melanie Truscott, who resided in a space station in orbit around Quraqua.

Unfortunately, Truscott is dead-set on adhering to her orders, and refuses once again to delay the operation. Faced with this reality, Hutch attempts to fulfill her mission quickly and efficiently – evacuate the remaining Academy personnel, equipment, and artifacts from the surface before the deadline.

Her efforts are hampered by the fact that many of the scientists want to squeeze every second they can from their remaining time, and are reluctant to depart until it is absolutely necessary.

The science team on the surface was excavating "The Temple of Winds," a sprawling complex that served many different functions over its thousands of years of history.

The Temple was originally above ground, but tectonic forces had lowered it below sea level. Consequently, the archaeology team was based in an underwater dome structure, and the excavation of the site had to deal with slow movement, and shifting mud and silt – unusual obstacles.

Their main mission at the time was to search for more examples of "Linear C," the language of the mysterious inscription on Oz. The team's philologist, Maggie Tufu, was convinced that she could decode the message if they could just find some more substantial examples of text to add to their scant library. To accomplish this, the team was excavating at break-neck pace deeper and deeper into the unexplored temple.

Meanwhile, Hutch familiarized herself with the personnel while taking load after load of artifacts and scientists up to the "Winckelmann" via the ship's shuttlecraft, "Alpha."

Richard was also brought up to speed on the history of Quraqua. Although the society existed for many thousands of years, they never achieved a high level of technology, but rather stagnated for long periods of time, and experienced many Dark Ages.

In particular, there were several recorded "discontinuities," where it appeared that some mysterious and rapid disaster befell the planet. One such event coincided with the construction and damaging of Oz.

The dig team had just discovered a potentially significant artifact (a printing press that could unlock the Linear C language), when disaster struck.

Convinced that the Academy team would willfully ignore the terraforming deadline, the Kosmik operation decided to give them a demonstration of the dangers of remaining on Quraqua. They willfully nudged a small comet out of orbit that crashed into the sea, creating a tsunami that caused significant damage to the dig site.

The personnel had enough warning to shelter themselves, but the wave buried the printing press before they could excavate it.

Angered, Hutch and her new friend Janet Allegri created a faux-comet out of packing foam and launched it from orbit at the Kosmik space station. This caused a panic and evacuation of the station, but no physical damage. Melanie Truscott, director of the station, secretly decided that she couldn't very well hold a grudge for being played by her own game.

Around this time, Richard made some inquiries to a colleague who was studying the planet Nok. It would come to be known that Nok, in addition to Quraqua, had apparently suffered mysterious "discontinuities" in its long and troubled history, and a pattern emerged from this information: a period of roughly 8,000 years lay between each discontinuity.

In addition, a number of new Monuments were discovered in deep orbit around Nok – a series of free-floating, enormous cubes, which were scorched and damaged – very reminiscent of Oz.

With the printing press buried, many on the team felt defeated, but many others were more determined than ever to excavate the machines. The evacuation continued but Henry and several others were not quite able to load the machines and themselves by the time the deadline passed, and the nuclear devices were detonated at the planet's poles.

In the end, the presses were retrieved and all of the personnel made it out – with the exception of Richard, Hutch's friend and the expert on the Monument-Makers.

This angered many of the team, and there were differing opinions as to who held the most blame for Richard's death: Henry, for pushing his team too hard in the face of danger; Maggie, for her insistence that the alien machines had to be recovered; or even Hutch, who Henry felt had only hurt the situation by her desperate pleas to leave well enough alone and get out of harm's way.

Fortunately, Maggie was soon able to decipher the perplexing inscription from Oz: "Farewell and good fortune. Seek us by the light of the  eye." A  was a mythical beast on Quraqua, and the passage referred to a part of a stellar constellation – it pointed the way to the home of the Monument-Makers.

Using the out-of-place cylindrical towers on Oz as waypoint markers, Hutch and Frank (the second-in-command of the Quraqua expedition) were able to make a list of potential stars that the passage might be referring to. Then with a powerful radio telescope, they surveyed all the candidates and found one that was broadcasting a faint artificial transmission – Beta Pacifica.

Ecstatic, the Academy quietly approved an urgent mission to investigate the star system. The mission would consist of Hutch, Frank, Maggie, Janet, and George Hackett, another veteran from Quraqua.

At the last minute, they received orders from the government to halt their mission – apparently, the idea of charging into the potential heart of an unknown space-faring civilization was something they didn't trust to an Academy scout ship – but the crew willfully ignored the instruction and leaped into hyperspace on their weeks-long journey to Beta Pacifica.

Specifically, they knew that the source of the radio transmission originated not on a planet, but at a point in space roughly 15 AU from the star. On the long journey, the five crewmates grew quite close, and a romance blossomed between Hutch and George.

Upon arrival at Beta Pacifica, disaster struck again. They emerged from their jump extremely close to a mysterious object in space, a vast black mass larger than Earth's moon which, inexplicably, the instruments claimed had no measurable mass.

At their current velocity, there was no way to divert from the object in time, and the crew resigned themselves to a quick death via collision. Their death never came, however, because they somehow passed "through" the object – although not without suffering heavy damage in the process.

They lost many ship's systems and sent out a general distress call to the nearest human presences, at Quraqua and Nok. When they received word that rescue would be slow in coming from Nok, the crew felt dismayed and helpless.

At one point it appeared as if they would run out of air before rescue arrived, but Hutch managed to remedy the problem at the last minute. Eventually, help arrived not from Nok, but from Quraqua, in the form of their former foe, Melanie Truscott. Truscott had been accompanying Kosmik employees back to Earth when she diverted her course to lend assistance to the crew of the "Winckelmann."

At first, Truscott was unwilling to stay in the Beta Pacifica system for any reason, because she was anxious to complete her mission to return her batch of employees to Earth, but quickly changed her mind after a rapid series of tantalizing discoveries made it clear that this star system was of major importance.

First, they determined that the object that Hutch's crew ran into was a vast dish-shaped telescope, and that the alien radio transmission emanated from its center. Further, the dish was one of eight such objects orbiting the star, although the rest appeared to be defunct.

In addition, the structure was "organic" in nature, and had already nearly healed the damage caused by the impact event. The reason the ship survived, and the reason the object registered as having so little mass, was because the dish was extremely thin.

At the present time, the telescope array was not pointed at any particular object in the sky, but they determined that roughly 10,000 years ago, the network would have been observing the Large Magellanic Cloud, the largest satellite galaxy of the Milky Way.

Besides the dish array, there was one terrestrial planet in the star system that bore a startling resemblance to Earth in terms of physical characteristics. From all appearances, settling of the planet could, in principle, begin immediately, with no terraforming required.

The crew had high hopes that they had discovered the home planet of the Monument-Makers, but the night side of the planet showed no artificial light sources, and the planet emanated no artificial electromagnetic waves of any kind.

However, there were two anomalies. First, the largest of the planet's four moons featured a giant cube of stone, which was damaged and scorched just like the Monuments at Quraqua and Nok. Second, they discovered an artificial space station in orbit around the world. They immediately set out to investigate.

To their dismay, the space station was not the creation of a highly advanced race, as the Monument-Makers were known to be. In actuality, the level of technology was even below current human standards.

Nevertheless, the Academy crew, along with Truscott and her lieutenant, boarded the powerless and airless space station to investigate. What they discovered was very unsettling: dozens of alien corpses, apparently the same race as the Monument-Makers, who had all committed suicide by strapping themselves to their chairs and venting the atmosphere of the station.

No one could come up with a good reason for this event, which they all found very disturbing. Nor could anyone explain why the Monument-Makers were inhabiting a station of such inferior technology.

One theory was that the station remained from their earliest days of space exploration, but in order for that to be true, the station would have to be many tens of thousands of years old, which did not seem plausible.

Luckily, in order to date the station, they discovered a photograph of the planet's four moons in perfect alignment, and extrapolated how long ago such a configuration would have happened. The answer was 4743 B.C., a time well after the Monument-Makers were known to possess advanced technology.

The surface of the planet held only ruins, and the Academy team went down to investigate. What they found were structures much too primitive to have been made by a hyper-advanced space-faring race.

Sadly, tragedy again befell the Academy crew when they were attacked by a mysteriously unrelenting horde of predatory crab-like creatures with razor sharp claws and mandibles. George, Maggie, and their Kosmik pilot were killed, and Frank and Janet were severely wounded. They escaped thanks to Hutch's piloting skills, but were  saddened by the price they paid.

Back on the Kosmik starship, though, Hutch was struck by inspiration. When she included the dates of the Discontinuities of Quraqua and Nok with the final days of the primitive Beta Pacifica space station, she discovered a repeating pattern of sweeping devastation that spread outward, going from one planet to the next.

If her theory was correct, she could extrapolate the current position of this destructive wave in space: they could plot a course and go see what had caused numerous disasters across multiple inhabited planets.

Leaving the Kosmik ship for the newly arrived Academy vessel, they set out, once again, to try and solve their cosmic mystery once and for all.

They arrived in an unnamed star system that had already been surveyed decades previously. At first they found nothing unusual, and decided to make their OWN monument – a set of giant cubic structures, in an attempt to recreate the environment of the other disasters.

They used a cutting laser and a shuttlecraft to begin to transform some natural stone plateaus into giant cubes, just like at the other planets.

Shortly thereafter, they detected two strange anomalies – giant clouds in space, traveling at a high speed. Although the clouds were quite large – planet sized, at least – they were far too small to be natural objects. With insufficient mass, they should have been ripped apart by the star system's gravity.

One of the mysterious clouds was on the far side of the solar system, but one would pass relatively close to the moon on which they were creating their fake Monuments. The mystery deepened when, suddenly, the nearby cloud began to change direction and reduce speed, on a direct course for the moon and the new monuments. This was, obviously, inconsistent with any natural phenomena.

In the end, the mystery cloud was drawn towards both the cubic monument and the roughly cubic shuttlecraft, and annihilated them both. The crew survived by evacuating the shuttle, and finally discovered the nemesis that had plagued advanced societies for thousands of years. In fact, they deduced that biblical disasters on Earth corresponded to the pattern of destruction as well.

They arrived at the conclusion that the Monument-Makers had constructed their creations in an attempt to be lures for the deadly clouds – which came to be called Omega clouds. They attempted to save the populations of the planets in question by luring the clouds away from the right-angles and regular structures of their buildings and roads by putting geometric shapes in other locations.

This strategy had not succeeded, and the clouds had attacked the alien populations and the Monuments. The clouds had even hit the Monument-Makers themselves, throwing their society into a technological dark age – the space station and ruined buildings at Beta Pacifica were the remnants of their second, lesser civilization, which itself was nearly annihilated when the cycle repeated on its 8,000-year timescale.

It was discovered that the remnants of the space-faring Monument-Makers – or Cholois, as they were called – were observing the Large Magellanic Cloud because they evacuated to that location.

The implications were that the Omega clouds menace the entire galaxy, and the only way to escape them is to leave the galaxy entirely. In fact, the cycle of the clouds meant that they would be upon Earth in just 1,000 years.

Given that the Monument-Makers were more advanced than humanity, and that they had even more time to deal with the problem and failed, the outlook for Earth's future looks bleak.

Characters
Priscilla Hutchins
Frank Carson
Janet Allegri
Richard Wald
Henry Jacobi
Linda Thomas
Maggie Tufu: Chief philologist or code breaker.
Melanie Truscott: Director of "Kosmik operation".
Cal Hartlett: Financial analyst with the brokerage firm of Forman & Dyer.

References

External links

1994 American novels
1994 science fiction novels
Ace Books books
American science fiction novels
Fiction set on Iapetus (moon)
Large Magellanic Cloud in fiction
Novels by Jack McDevitt
Xenoarchaeology in fiction